The 2012 Singapore League Cup (known as the StarHub League Cup for sponsorship purposes) was held between 26 July to 11 August 2012. Traditionally held as a knockout competition, the 2012 edition saw a new format where four groups of three teams battled it out for a place in the semi-finals. In addition, the four teams that finished third in their respective groups played in a separate Plate Competition consisting of two semi-finals and a final.

The winner of the StarHub League Cup, DPMM FC, walked away with SGD$30,000 in prize money, while the runner up of the competition, Geylang United received SGD$15,000 in prize money.  The winner of the Plate competition, Balestier Khalsa, also walked away with SGD$5,000 in prize money.

The draw for the Cup was held on Thursday, 12 July 2012 at the Football Association of Singapore's headquarters in Jalan Besar Stadium, Singapore. While 12 teams from the S.League will playing in the StarHub League Cup, Malaysia’s Harimau Muda A did not be participating in this competition. This was because the Young Tigers had earlier served notice that they were invited for another tournament in Austria scheduled for the same Muslim fasting month period.

StarHub broadcast both semi-finals and the final ‘live’ on its sports channel, SuperSports Arena.

Preliminary stage 
Group A: Singapore Armed Forces FC, Tanjong Pagar United FC, DPMM FC

Group B: Albirex Niigata (S), Balestier Khalsa FC, Geylang United FC

Group C: Home United FC, Young Lions FC, Hougang United FC

Group D: Tampines Rovers FC, Woodlands Wellington FC, Gombak United FC

Group A

Group B

Group C

Group D

Knockout stage

Quarterfinals

Semifinals

Final

Plate Competition

The Plate competition will be made up of the four teams that finish third in their respective groups. Balestier Khalsa became the winners of the inaugural Plate Competition when they beat the Young Lions FC by a single goal scored in the dying minutes of the plate final by Prime League striker, Kim Min-ho.

Plate Knockout stage

Plate Semi-finals

Plate final

See also
 S.League
 Singapore Cup
 Singapore Charity Shield
 Football Association of Singapore
 List of football clubs in Singapore

References

External links
 SLeague.Com: WANTED: Two ardent fans of Harimau Muda and DPMM (for League Cup 2012 draw)
 SLeague.com: League Cup 2012 Fixtures and Scores

2012
League Cup
2012 domestic association football cups
July 2012 sports events in Asia
August 2012 sports events in Asia